Augury is a technology company that produces hardware, artificial intelligence, and software that diagnose malfunctions in machinery.

History
Augury was founded in 2011 by Saar Yoskovitz, who currently serves as their CEO, and the company's Chief Technology Officer Gal Shaul. In 2015, the company received $7 million in investment from a Series A round of funding, in 2017, it received $17 million in venture funding, and in 2019, it received an investment of $25 million in a Series C venture capital round, bringing its investment total to $51 million. The company has offices in New York and Haifa, Israel.

In January 2019, Augury acquired Alluvium.

References 

2011 establishments in New York City
Companies based in Haifa
Companies based in New York City
Technology companies of the United States
Technology companies established in 2011
2011 establishments in Israel

he:אוגורי סיסטמס